Bolzan is an Italian surname. Notable people with the surname include:

Adaílton (footballer, born 1977), full name Adaílton Martins Bolzan, Brazilian footballer
Erminio Bolzan (born 1908), Italian boxer
Riccardo Bolzan (born 1984), Italian footballer
Scott Bolzan (born 1962), American former football player

See also
Bolzano
Francesco Bolzoni, Italian footballer

Italian-language surnames